I'm Not Angry! (translit. Asabani Nistam!) is a 2014 Iranian drama film written and directed by Reza Dormishian, starring Navid Mohamadzadeh and Baran Kosari. The film was screened in the Panorama section of the 64th Berlin International Film Festival. The film depicts the bitter story of Navid, an Iranian Kurd university student, who has become "starred" Navid tries hard not to lose his love Setareh in the movie. They met 4 years ago during the unrest in Tehran after the disputed election in 2009, and now Setareh's father asks Navid to clarify his relation with her. We accompany Navid in his efforts to provide the minimum requirements of living, and we take a glance at the various layers of the social classes in Iran.

I’m not angry! is an independent product in the Iranian cinema. That is, the film has not received any financial help from any institute, organisation, centre, institution, state-run or non-governmental network or foundation. The shooting of I’m not angry! was done in more than 60 locations from the northernmost to the southernmost areas in Tehran. A 2013 production, I’m Not Angry!, was a controversial film in 32nd Fajr International Film Festival in 2014 and the only Iranian film in 64th Berlin International Film Festival in 2014. It is Reza Dormishian's second feature film after the feature Hatred. Shot completely in Tehran, I’m Not Angry! explicitly criticises today's conditions in Iran, and as it is written at the beginning of the film, it is ‘A Free Adaptation of Today Iran’.

Berlin International Film Festival in its festival's website announced on 18 January that I’m Not Angry! would be screened in the 64th Berlinale, held 6–16 February 2014 in Germany, as the sole representative of the Iranian cinema. The film had an enthusiastic reception from the critics and audience, and after each screening, Reza Dormishian and the two leading actors Navid Mohammadzadeh and Baran Kosari attended the press conferences among lengthy applauses.

Synopsis
I’m Not Angry! is the story of Navid, a "starred" (student expelled for political reasons) university student who—while trying to provide the minimum requirements of a normal life—tries not to get angry when he is faced with the immoralities prevalent in his society, and he does all he can not to lose his love, Setareh.

Cast
Navid Mohammadzadeh as Navid
Baran Kosari as Setareh
Reza Behboudi as Mr. Javadi
 Milad Rahimi as Ahmad
Amir Reza Amiraqa as Mohsen
Misaq Zaré as Mr. Bagheri
Reza Koulqani as Reza
Hojjat Hassanpour Sargaroui as Amir
Mohamad Kart as Sasan
Tinou Salehi as Hamid
Bahram Afshari as Real Estate Agent

Production 
 Director of Photography: Ali Azhari
 Sound recording: Nezamoddin Kiaie
 Sound mixing: Mohammad Reza Delpak
 Sound editing: Reza Narimizadeh
 Make-up artist: Mehrdad Mirkiani
 Costume design: Baran Kousari
 Product management: Mehdi Badrloo
 Visual effects: Amir Saharkhiz, Kamran Saharkhiz
 Assistant director: Pedram Alizadeh
 Photography: Mohamad Badrloo
 Released by: Filmiran

Awards

 17th Shanghai International Film Festival, Best Film Award, 2014
 17th Shanghai International Film Festival, Best Director Award, for Reza Dormishian, 2014
 17th Shanghai International Film Festival, Vincent Ward Prize sponsored by the University of Canterbury, for 'Best Film and Best Director for the Asian New Talent Prize', for Reza Dormishian, New Zealand, 2015
 8th Celebration of Iran's Film Critics and Writers Association, Best Actor Award, for Navid Mohamadzadeh, 2014
 8th Celebration of Iran's Film Critics and Writers Association, Best Edit Award, for Haydeh Safiyari, 2014
 8th Celebration of Iran's Film Critics and Writers Association, Honorary Diploma Award for Best Director 'Reza Dormishian', 2014
 15th Asiatica Film Mediale of Roma, Special Mention, Best Asian Feature Film Award, 2014
 Asia Pacific Screen Awards, APSA Academy NETPAC Development Prize, for Reza Dormishian, 2014
 5th London Iranian Film Festival, Best Narrative Feature Award, for Reza Dormishian, 2014
 4th Iranian Film Festival Australia (IFFA), Audience choice Award, 2014
 4th Iranian film festival Czech Republic (IFF), Audience Award, 2015

Nominations 

 8th Annual Asia Pacific Screen Awards (APSA), nominated for 2 awards, 2014
 8th Celebration of Iran's Film Critics and Writers Association, nominated for 7 awards, 2014
 32nd Fajr International film festival, nominated for Best Man Actor Award, for Navid Mohamadzadeh, 2014
 32nd Fajr International film festival, nominated for Best Woman Actor Award, for Baran Kousari, 2014
32nd Fajr International film festival, ‌nominated for best Edith, for Hayedeh Safiyari, 2014
32nd Fajr International film festival, ‌nominated for best sound recording, for Nezamoddin Kiaie , 2014
32nd Fajr International film festival, ‌nominated for best sound mixing, for Mohammad Reza Delpak, 2014
32nd Fajr International film festival, ‌nominated for best Visual effects, for Amir Saharkhiz and Kamran Saharkhiz, 2014

Notes

References

External links
 Official Trailer
 

2014 films
Iranian drama films
2010s Persian-language films
2010s political drama films
Films about psychiatry
Films about social class